Boxing at the 1988 Summer Olympics took place in the Jamsil Students' Gymnasium in Seoul between 17 September and 2 October. Twelve men's individual boxing events were contested, attended by 432 athletes and 159 officials from 106 countries. The events were notable for a controversial decision in the light middleweight championship bout between American Roy Jones Jr. and South Korean Park Si-Hun, when Roy Jones was denied gold despite being vastly superior.

Medalists

Medal table

References

External links
 Amateur Boxing

 
1988
1988 Summer Olympics events
Olympics